Yuanmenkou is a subdistrict of Wugang City in Hunan, China. It was one of four subdistricts approved to establish in 1994. The subdistrict of Yuanshukou has 5 villages and 4 communities under its jurisdiction.

History
The subdistrict of Yuanmenkou was approved to establish from a portion of the former Chengguan Town and four villages of Zinan, Ziyun, Shuiping and Cuiyun of the former Faxiangyan Township in 1994.

In 2016, Chengnan Village was formed through the amalgamation of four villages of Ziyun, Cuiyun, Shuiping and Santangyuan, its villages were reduced to 5 from 9, it has 5 villages and 4 communities under its jurisdiction.

Subdivisions
Through the amalgamation of villages in 2016, the number of villages was reduced to 5 from 8, the subdistrict of Yuanmenkou has 4 communities and 5 villages under its jurisdiction.

5 villages
 Chengnan Village
 Gexin Village
 Gushan Village
 Luozipu Village
 Zinan Village

4 communities
 Aoshan Community
 Shipaifang Community
 Shuiyun Community
 Zaoximen Community

References

Wugang, Hunan
Subdistricts of Hunan